Chinna Gounder is a 1992 Indian Tamil-language drama film directed by R. V. Udayakumar, starring Vijayakanth, Sukanya, Manorama, Salim Ghouse, Sathyapriya, Goundamani, Senthil and Vadivelu. It was released on 14 January 1992, during Pongal. The film was remade in Telugu as Chinarayudu, and in Kannada as Chikkejamanru.

Plot 
Thavasi alias Chinna Gounder is a rich and respected landlord in Coimbatore district. His family has been the hereditary Village Judge for a group of 18 villages and Thavasi takes over that work 10 years after his dad's death. Thavasi father, in an ill condition was asked to preside over a very tricky case and died before passing judgement. The case was that then newly built village temple stood on a land belonging to Sundari, the concubine of another landlord and Thavasi's sister's husband Sakkara Gounder. Sakkara had cited law and sealed off the temple premises days before its opening. Thavasi investigates the case, and clearly proves that the document of land purchase is fake, and decrees that the temple premises belongs to the Village. He is appreciated by a district judge upon seeing his swift decision-making skills. Chinna Gounder lives with his mother Aatha and is the most respectable person in the village, known for his justice and loyalty. Rivalry exists between Chinna Gounder and his brother-in-law Sakkara Gounder, who is accused of marrying Sundari, following Chinna Gounder's sister's death.

Sakkara Gounder plans to grab the local temple premises by forging false documents, but Chinna Gounder exposes the frauds committed, thereby preventing the temple premises from going into the hands of the roadies. Sakkara Gounder is angered and waits for an opportunity to knock out Chinna Gounder.

Deivanai is a poor, talkative girl in the village. Deivanai often gets into silly verbal conflicts with Chinna Gounder and his mother. One day, the Chinna Gounder is walking through the, village. Some children complained that Deivanai were holding their spinning tops. They asked him to get it back from her. He went to talk with her, But she challenges in spinning top game. The challenge was that losers should lie down and the spinning top will leave to spin on their belly. Afraid of losing the bet, he escaped from there, then she said jokingly that you must come to play the game. At that day , he learned to spin the spinning top game and  then the next day won the spinning top game. Deivanai returned the spinning tops to the children and tries to escape from the punishment. But Gounder and the children were surrounded. She was lied down and he leaves his spinning top to spin on her belly. She screamed by being embrassed.
Chinna Gounder and Deivanai fall in love in the ensuing hilarious fights.

While, Chinna Gounder's mother is bitten by a snake in their farm and is luckily spotted by Deivanai, who offers help, and her life is saved. Chinna Gounder thanks Deivanai for her timely help and offers her money, which she does not accept. Chinna Gounder is impressed upon seeing her genuineness.

Deivanai owes some money to Sakkara Gounder which she had borrowed for her younger sister's education. As she could not repay the debt in the timely manner, she offers to serve food for everyone and collect some money donated by the invitees after having the food (that is the custom followed in the village for those who are unable to repay debt). Chinna Gounder offers a marriage proposal to Deivanai as he says that he is also bound to repay for the timely help offered by her, which saved his mother's life.

Chinna Gounder is married to Deivanai, and life progresses smoothly for sometime, until Sakkara Gounder interferes with a plan. Sakkara Gounder poisons the local pond and blames Chinna Gounder for that. He also sets up a false witness to trap Chinna Gounder. Deivanai overhears Sakkara Gounder's plans, and in the act of trying to stop the witness from reaching the panchayat, she attacks the witness with a sickle. Later, the police arrests Deivanai with a murder charge, as the man whom she attacked is dead. Deivanai is jailed in the event of saving her husband.

Deivanai's sister now comes to Chinna Gounder's home as she is left alone. One day, it is revealed that Deivanai's sister is pregnant, and Chinna Gounder is blamed for that too. As Chinna Gounder also remains silent over the issue, his mother sends him out of their house. Deivanai is shocked upon hearing this and believes that her husband has betrayed her trust and love. She refuses to even meet him when he comes to visit her in jail.

A few months pass by, and Deivanai comes from jail to visit her sister, who is about to deliver a baby. She scolds her sister for having an illicit relationship with Chinna Gounder. However, her sister reveals that he is no way related to her pregnancy. A small flashback is shown where Deivanai's sister was in love with a local villager (the same guy who was falsely set up as a witness against Chinna Gounder and was killed by Deivanai), following which she got pregnant. As Chinna Gounder does not want to tarnish her image in front of the villagers, he accepted the blame. Deivanai realizes her mistake and apologizes to her husband. Deivanai's sister gives birth to a baby and dies.

Now the advocate, who already knows about Chinna Gounder, finds out that he is in trouble and decides to offer help. He takes over the case in favor of Deivanai and begins his ground work. He gets the postmortem report and finds out that the cause of death of the man attacked by Deivanai was lack of breath. Meanwhile, Deivanai is kidnapped by Sakkara Gounder. Chinna Gounder comes to her rescue and saves her. Chinna Gounder produces Sakkara Gounder in front of the village panchayat, where it is revealed that it was him who killed the witness and decided to blame Deivanai. In the end, Chinna Gounder and Deivanai come out clean from the accusations made over them. Sakkara Gounder begs the villagers to forgive him, but no one listens to him. Chinna Gounder then forgives him for all his misdeeds by stating that he only wanted Sakkara Gounder to realise his mistakes.

Cast 
 Vijayakanth as Chinna Gounder (Thavasi)
 Sukanya as Deivaanai (Chinna Gounder's wife)
 Manorama as Aatha (Chinna Gounder's mother)
 Salim Ghouse as Sakkarai Gounder (Chinna Gounder's brother-in-law)
 Meera as Sakkarai Goundar's daughter
 Sathyapriya as Sundari
 Goundamani as Vellai
 Senthil as Vellai's assistant
 Vadivelu as Maakali, Chinna Gounder's servant
 Ra. Sankaran as Advocate
 Mayilsamy
 Kamala Kamesh
 Devaki as Deivanai's sister

Production 
Chinna Gounder was entirely shot at Sethumadai near Pollachi. The title character was largely inspired by Udayakumar's uncle Athiyan, who served as a village chairman in the Thuckanaickenpalayam municipality for many years. To portray her character, Manorama wore dentures.

Soundtrack 
The music was composed by Ilaiyaraaja, while the lyrics were by R. V. Udayakumar.

Reception 
Sundarji of Kalki called the story ordinary, but praised the cast performances and music. Chinna Gounder won the Tamil Nadu State Film Award for Best Film – Third Prize, and Sukanya won the award for Best Actress at the same ceremony. At the 13th Cinema Express Awards, she won the Cinema Express Award for Best Actress – Tamil.

References

External links 
 

1990s Tamil-language films
1992 drama films
1992 films
Films directed by R. V. Udayakumar
Films scored by Ilaiyaraaja
Indian drama films
Tamil films remade in other languages